The City of Lougheed is the second-largest shopping centre in Burnaby, British Columbia, Canada, with  and over 160 shops and services. It is located in the northeast corner of Burnaby near the Coquitlam border. The centre is located adjacent to Lougheed Town Centre station, an interchange station that connects the Expo Line and Millennium Line of Metro Vancouver's SkyTrain rapid transit system.

History

The centre (originally known as Lougheed Mall) opened in 1969 with anchors The Bay, Safeway, and Woolco and also had a three-screen movie theatre within the mall complex from 1969 to 2002. It was operated by Famous Players from its 1969 opening until it closed in February 1991, then sat vacant for a few months until the Theatre Near You chain took it over in November that year as a discount second-run cinema, running it until it closed for good in 2002 when mall management terminated the lease and had the former theatre renovated for additional retail space. The mall was expanded and doubled in size in 1986 and was extensively renovated in the early 2000s. Security at the mall is headed by GuardTek.

In keeping with the Master Plan, the Lougheed Town Centre site has been redeveloped into a mixed-use urban community called the City of Lougheed with 300 new shops and restaurants,  of public parks and plazas and more than 10,000 new homes. Demolition has begun on the east portion of the site to make way for The First Neighbourhood which includes four residential towers and new retail, scheduled for completion in 2021. In 2018, the existing food court closed and The Eateries, a new casual dining area, opened to initiate the transition from Lougheed Town Centre to the City of Lougheed. Future development will roll out over multiple phases. The project is being completed by real estate management, investment and development company Shape Properties Corp.

Master plan
The City of Lougheed is one of four town centres designated by Burnaby to offer a full range of housing, office, retail, services and the option to walk, bike, take transit or drive to access a mix of goods and services. All four town centres are served by rapid transit and provide higher-density housing opportunities.

The master plan for the Lougheed Town Centre Core Area was adopted by Burnaby City Council on August 29, 2016. This was an undertaking of city staff in collaboration with Shape Properties Corp., James KM Cheng Architects Inc., and various consultant teams. Two public consultation processes also contributed to the development of the master plan, including open houses and information displays in the community. The master plan lays out the Lougheed Core Area's transformation into a transit-connected, mixed-use area with diverse housing, employment, service, and recreation opportunities. The master plan is used to inform and guide site-specific rezoning applications within the Lougheed Town Centre Core Area and was awarded the Planning Institute of British Columbia's (PIBC) "2016 Award for Excellence in Planning Practice – City and Urban Areas – GOLD".

Transportation
The City of Lougheed is served by the regional SkyTrain system, with the closest station being Lougheed Town Centre station, which is one of the exchange stations between Expo Line trains bound for Waterfront station and Millennium Line trains bound for either Lafarge Lake–Douglas station or VCC–Clark station. The mall is also served by a bus loop, with routes going to the Tri-Cities area, Burnaby, New Westminster, and express service to Fraser Heights, Langley, and as far east as the Fraser Valley.

References

External links
Official website of the City of Lougheed

Shopping malls in Metro Vancouver
Shopping malls established in 1969
Buildings and structures in Burnaby
Tourist attractions in Burnaby